Central Auditing Commission (CAC),, Centralnaya revizionnaya komissiya) was a supervisory organ within the Communist Party of the Soviet Union. Similar organs existed in a number of other communist parties, which were analogous with that of the CPSU.

The Central Auditing Commission was elected by and reported to the CPSU Party Congress and its membership was just below that of the CPSU Central Committee within the intraparty bureaucratic hierarchy.

The Central Auditing Commission supervised the expeditious and proper handling of affairs by the central bodies of the Party, and audited the accounts of the treasury and the enterprises of the CPSU Central Committee.

It is not to be confused with yet another CPSU control organ: the Party Control Committee of the CPSU Central Committee, which was responsible for enforcing Party discipline.

Chairmen

References 

 
Bodies of the Communist Party of the Soviet Union
1921 establishments in Russia
1991 disestablishments in the Soviet Union